The KC Streetcar is a streetcar system in Downtown Kansas City, Missouri. Construction began in May 2014. The system opened for service on May 6, 2016. The KC Streetcar is free to ride, as it is funded by a transportation development district. , the streetcar has had 11.2 million riders since opening in 2016. Extensions north to the waterfront and south to University of Missouri-Kansas City have been funded, with the southern extension under construction.

Route
The downtown streetcar runs along a  route between the River Market and Union Station, running through the central business district and the Crossroads, mostly along Main Street. It makes stops about every two blocks. and has 10 designated stops along the route. It connects directly with Amtrak, local and commuter RideKC bus services (including a direct route to Kansas City International Airport) and several RideKC bike-share kiosks.

Proponents tout the initial segment as one of the simplest and straightest modern streetcar routes in the United States. All platforms offer level boarding and real-time arrival information.

History

Development

After earlier efforts to create a metro- or citywide rail transit system failed at the ballot box, voters in downtown Kansas City approved funding for a two-mile streetcar line in December 2012.

In December 2012, the city council awarded a contract to HDR, Inc. to complete a final design for the downtown streetcar line. HDR had previously performed preliminary engineering work. In October 2013, the mayor announced that the system will use 100% low-floor Urbos 3 streetcars made by the American subsidiary of Construcciones y Auxiliar de Ferrocarriles (CAF) in Elmira Heights, New York. Pre-construction work, utility-relocation work in preparation for the project, began in late 2013, and construction of the line began in May 2014. Construction was completed in late 2015 and testing was performed from December 2015 to May 2016.

The projected cost of the Downtown streetcar was $102 million. The majority of funds came from Special Obligation Bonds of the City of Kansas City, Missouri totaling $64 million. Construction bonds and operating costs were repaid by a special assessment and 1% sales tax collected inside a transportation development district (TDD) approved by voters in 2012. Both levies are assessed only within the taxing district, which encompasses downtown neighborhoods along the streetcar route. Additional funding included a utility contribution and two federal grants totaling $17.1 million. The project received another $20 million federal grant, through the TIGER program, in August 2013. Passengers ride free of charge, as operating costs are covered by the TDD. Total construction costs were $250,000 under budget and operations costs started out under budget.

The streetcars are numbered 801–806, following the numbering set up by the original Kansas City Public Service Company numbering system. Car 801 arrived in Kansas City on November 2, 2015. Testing began on November 6. Cars 802 through 804 later arrived between December and April 2016.

Opening 
Operations on KC Streetcar began on May 6, 2016, at approximately 11am. The total opening Friday and Saturday ridership was over 27,000 riders, with the trains travelling 650 miles. The weekend celebration for the streetcars opening included music, a free carnival, fireworks and coordinated specials at businesses. Bus service and bike share service was free to correspond with the launch. Following the opening of the line, local officials stated the line had exceeded their expectations, with over 100,000 riders in the first two weeks, and a million riders after 5 months.

Ridership 

The line was originally projected to have a daily average ridership of just 2,700. Average yearly ridership levels have been around double this figure. The streetcar is free to ride, and is funded by the local transportation development district. Ridership is calculated by the use of automatic, anonymous passenger counters at each streetcar door - with manual checks to ensure accuracy.

Following initial high ridership, two additional streetcars were ordered from CAF in June 2017 at a cost of $12 million. Car 805 arrived on May 13, 2019, and entered service on July 1, 2019. Car 806 arrived on August 26, 2019. The line celebrated 5 million riders in September 2018. On July 5, 2019, the streetcar had its busiest one day ridership, with 15,559 riders.

The COVID-19 pandemic heavily impacted ridership, which dropped by two-thirds to just 2,148 daily riders in 2020. In 2021, ridership levels recovered, but to levels lower than before the pandemic. The line celebrated 10 million riders in April 2022. By January 2023, KC Streetcar reported that demand had recovered to 85% of pre-pandemic levels, with high demand in evenings and at weekends.

Expansion 
Expansion planning began in 2014. Two studies covered one line north, crossing the Missouri River and eight lines heading east, west and south from downtown. A ballot proposition in August 2014 to add three new rail lines and an improved bus line failed 40%–60%. A grassroots effort to revisit expansion using the same legal structure as the starter line, is being funded by the private sector. Two extensions - one south to University of Missouri-Kansas City (UMKC) along Main Street, and one north to Berkley Riverfront Park - were funded and are expected to open beginning in 2023. As with the original line, the extensions will be free to ride.

University of Missouri-Kansas City 
In August 2017, voters approved the formation of a transportation development district (TDD) that would help to fund the extension of the streetcar south. In 2017 the extension was expected to cost around $227 million and open around 2023. In March 2019, the Federal Transit Administration (FTA) rated the project a "medium high" in receiving $151.6 million in federal funding. In December 2020, the FTA announced it had awarded the KC Streetcar $174 million for the extension south to UMKC, with remaining funding for the extension coming from the expanded TDD. As part of the extension, 6 additional streetcars will be ordered from CAF, doubling the size of the fleet. , the extension to UMKC is scheduled to open in 2025. Groundbreaking occurred on April 6, 2022.

Berkley Riverfront Park 
In August 2017, the KC Port Authority announced plans to extend the line north from the River Market toward the Missouri River. This proposed extension would run for 3/4 mile north to Berkley Riverfront Park and a proposed Kansas City Current stadium. The extension would be funded by the KC Port Authority, as well as by federal TIGER funding. One additional streetcar would be required for this additional service. In December 2020, $14.2 million was awarded by the FTA towards the extension, with additional funding required from local sources such as Port KC. In October 2021, the cost of the extension had risen by $5.5 million. Construction is expected to begin in 2023 with opening in 2025.

Future 
In September 2021, the KC Streetcar Authority began studying the potential for a northern extension of the line over the Missouri River to North Kansas City. In October 2021, the KC Streetcar Authority and Kansas City Area Transportation Authority began planning a future east–west transit line along 39th Street towards University of Kansas Medical Center and Kansas City, Kansas.

Operating authority

The streetcar is operated by the Kansas City Streetcar Authority, a not-for-profit corporation that is funded by local taxes. The authority was incorporated in August 2012 after voters approved creation of the Kansas City Downtown Transportation Development District, a special taxing district that funds construction and operation of a two-mile route through downtown Kansas City. Legal claims against the district and its taxation power were dismissed in August 2013. The streetcar began construction in May 2014, was completed in fall 2015, and began carrying passengers in service on May 6, 2016.

The Streetcar Authority's 13 directors, a mix of public officials, business people, and transit advocates, were appointed by the City Council and Port Authority in late 2012 and met for the first time as an officially sanctioned body in early 2013. The authority's oversight of the streetcar's operation and maintenance is modeled on that of the Portland Streetcar. The city council has the power to appoint some of the authority's directors and retains ownership over the system.

Day-to-day operations and maintenance of the system is handled by Herzog Transit Services, under joint contract to the Streetcar Authority and the City of Kansas City. The contract was signed in October 2015.

Economic development 
Even prior to the opening of the line in 2016, new development was occurring along the route. Analysis by HDR, Inc. stated that the downtown area along the route received $1.8 billion of development between 2013 and 2018, with a quarter of the investment publicly credited to the creation of the streetcar.

The streetcar has also been praised by political leaders and venue operators for making Kansas City more attractive for events, such as the 2021 Big 12 men's basketball tournament and the 2023 NFL Draft.

Some residents have been concerned that development along the route will lead to gentrification.

See also
 Light rail in the United States
 List of streetcar systems in the United States (historical)
 Streetcars in Kansas City (historical)
 Streetcars in North America

References

Notes

External links

 

750 V DC railway electrification
Electric railways in Missouri
Public transportation in Kansas City, Missouri
Streetcars in Missouri
Transit agencies in Missouri
Zero-fare transport services
2016 establishments in Missouri